Newspapers in the United States have traditionally endorsed candidates for party nomination prior to their final endorsements for president. Below is the list of endorsements in 2008, by candidate, for each primary race.

Democrats

Dennis Kucinich
The Nation Magazine (after a poll of visitors on its website)

Joe Biden

The Storm Lake Times Storm Lake, Iowa

Hillary Clinton

Akron Beacon Journal
Anniston StarBend Bulletin newspaper in Bend, OregonBuffalo News
Burlington Hawk Eye newspaper in Burlington, Iowa
Cabinet Press group of weekly newspapers in New Hampshire which includes: The Milford Cabinet, Bedford Journal, Hollis Brookline Journal and Merrimack Journal
The Citizen (Laconia, NH)
Cape Cod Times newspaper in Cape Cod Massachusetts
Columbus Dispatch
The Commercial Appeal (Memphis, TN)
Concord Monitor newspaper in Concord, New Hampshire
 The New York Blade, an LGBT newspaper in New York City, New York
The Daily Texan college newspaper at University of Texas
The Daily Pennsylvanian college newspaper at the University of Pennsylvania
Denver Post 
The Des Moines Register 
El Mundo, Spanish-language newspaper in Nevada
El Mundo, Spanish-language newspaper group in San Francisco, California
Foster's Daily Democrat newspaper in Dover, New Hampshire
The Hartford Courant
Indianapolis Star (Indianapolis, Indiana)
Irish Voice Irish American Newspaper in the United StatesThe Jersey JournalKansas City Star newspaper in Kansas City, MissouriKeene Sentinel newspaper in Keene, New HampshireLaconia Citizen newspaper in Laconia, New HampshireLaredo Morning Times newspaper in Laredo, TexasLas Vegas Sun newspaper in Las Vegas, NevadaThe Montgomery AdvertiserThe Sun News, newspaper in Myrtle Beach, South Carolina
 The New York Amsterdam News NewsdayNew York Times Pittsburgh Tribune-ReviewOrlando Sentinel newspaper in Orlando, FloridaPlymouth Record Enterprise newspaper in Plymouth, New HampshirePost News Group newspaper group family in Berkeley, California, Oakland, California, Richmond, California, San Francisco, California and San Jose, California 
The Press-Enterprise newspaper in Inland Empire, California
Quad City Times, newspaper in the Quad Cities in Iowa
Salmon Press group of weekly newspapers in New Hampshire which includes: The Littleton Courier, Coos County Democrat (Lancaster, NH), Berlin Reporter, Granite State News (Wolfeboro, NH), Carroll County Independent (Conway, NH), Meredith News, Record Enterprise (Plymouth, NH), Winnisquam Echo (Tilton, NH), Gilford Steamer, Baysider (Alton, NH), and The Mountain Ear
The Salt Lake Tribune, newspaper in Salt Lake City, Utah
Statesman Journal, newspaper in Salem, Oregon
The Times Union (Albany, NY)
The Vinton Eagle weekly newspaper in Benton County, IowaWashington Blade, an LGBT newspaper in Washington, D.C.The Zanesville Times Recorder, a newspaper in Zanesville, Ohio

John Edwards

The Fresno Bee, daily newspaper of Fresno, California 
 Valley News Today, Shenandoah, Iowa

Barack ObamaAlbuquerque Journal newspaper in Albuquerque, New MexicoAmes Iowa State Daily newspaper in Ames, IowaThe Arizona Republic newspaper in Phoenix, ArizonaThe Aspen Times newspaper in Aspen, ColoradoAsianWeek newspaperAtlanta Daily World newspaper in Atlanta, GeorgiaAtlanta Journal-Constitution newspaper in Atlanta, GeorgiaAustin American StatesmanThe Baltimore Sun newspaper in Baltimore, Maryland Belleville News-Democrat newspaper in Belleville, IllinoisThe Bergen County Record newspaper in Hackensack, New JerseyThe Birmingham News newspaper in Birmingham, AlabamaBlack Voice News newspaperThe Boston Bay State Banner newspaper in Boston, MassachusettsBoston Globe newspaper in Boston, MassachusettsThe Boston Phoenix newspaper in Boston, MassachusettsThe Charlotte Observer newspaper in Charlotte, North CarolinaChicago Defender newspaper in Chicago, IllinoisChicago Sun Times newspaper in Chicago, IllinoisChicago Tribune newspaper in Chicago, IllinoisIndiana, Go with Obama, Chicago Tribune, May 4, 2008.Chico News & Review newspaper in Chico, CaliforniaThe Plain Dealer newspaper in Cleveland, Ohio Colorado Springs Independent newspaper in Colorado Springs, ColoradoThe Columbian newspaper in Vancouver, Washington Connecticut Post newspaper in Bridgeport, ConnecticutContra Costa Times newspaper in Walnut Creek, CaliforniaCorpus Christi Caller-Times newspaper in Corpus Christi, TexasThe Courier-Journal newspaper in Louisville, KentuckyDaily Herald newspaper in Arlington Heights, IllinoisThe Daily News Tribune newspaper in Waltham, MassachusettsThe Daily Star newspaper in Oneonta, New YorkDallas Morning News newspaper in Dallas, TexasThe Day newspaper in New London, ConnecticutThe Desert Sun newspaper in Palm Springs, CaliforniaEl Latino, Spanish-language newspaper in Des Moines, IowaEl Latino Endorses Obama El Latino, December 21, 2007.El Paso Times newspaper in El Paso, TexasElko Daily Free Press newspaper in Elko, NevadaFinancial Times newspaper in London, EnglandFort Worth Star-Telegram newspaper in Fort Worth, TexasThe Free Lance-Star newspaper in Fredericksburg, VirginiaFresno Bee newspaper in Fresno, CaliforniaThe Gainesville Sun newspaper in Gainesville, FloridaGay City News LGBT newspaper in New York CityThe Greenville News newspaper in Greenville, South CarolinaHobbs News-Sun newspaper in Hobbs, New MexicoThe Honolulu Advertiser newspaper in Honolulu, HawaiiHouston Chronicle newspaper in Houston, TexasHoy Spanish-language newspaper in Chicago, IllinoisInland Valley Daily Bulletin newspaper in Pomona ValleyIowa City Daily Iowan newspaper in Iowa City, IowaIowa City Press-Citizen newspaper in Iowa City, IowaJewish News of Greater Phoenix newspaper in Phoenix, ArizonaJoplin Globe newspaper in Joplin, MissouriJuneau Empire newspaper in Juneau, AlaskaKnoxville News Sentinel newspaper in Knoxville, TennesseeLas Vegas Review-Journal newspaper in Las Vegas, NevadaEl Latino, Spanish-language newspaper in Des Moines, IowaThe Littleton Courier newspaper in Littleton, MaineLittle India magazineLogan Herald-Observer newspaper in Logan, IowaLos Alamos Monitor newspaper in Los Alamos County, New MexicoLos Angeles Daily News newspaper in Los Angeles, CaliforniaLos Angeles Sentinel newspaper in Los Angeles, CaliforniaLos Angeles Times newspaper in Los Angeles, CaliforniaLos Angeles Wave newspaper in Los Angeles, CaliforniaMarin Independent Journal newspaper in Marin County, CaliforniaMemphis Tri-State Defender newspaper in Memphis, TennesseeMerced Sun-Star newspaper in Merced, CaliforniaMilwaukee Journal Sentinel newspaper in Milwaukee, WisconsinMinnesota Daily newspaper in Minneapolis, MinnesotaThe Modesto Bee newspaper in Modesto, California The Morning Call newspaper in Allentown, PennsylvaniaMundo Latino, Spanish language newspaper in Sioux City, IowaThe Nashua Telegraph newspaper in Nashua, New HampshireNative American Times newspaperNew Haven Register newspaper in New Haven, Connecticut The New York Observer newspaper in New York CityNew York Post newspaper in New York, New YorkNorth Bay Bohemian newspaper in North Bay, CaliforniaNorth Coast Journal newspaper in Humboldt County, CaliforniaNorwich Bulletin newspaper in Norwich, ConnecticutThe Oakland Tribune newspaper in Oakland, CaliforniaLa Opinión Spanish language newspaper in Los Angeles, CaliforniaThe Orange County Register newspaper in Santa Ana, CaliforniaThe Oregonian newspaper in Portland, OregonOttumwa Courier newspaper in Ottumwa, IowaPacific Sun newspaper in Marin County, CaliforniaThe Palm Beach Post newspaper in Palm Beach County, FloridaParadise Post newspaper in Paradise, CaliforniaPasadena Star-News newspaper in Pasadena, CaliforniaPensacola News Journal newspaper in Pensacola, FloridaPeoria Journal Star newspaper in Peoria, IllinoisPhiladelphia City Paper, newspaper in Philadelphia, PennsylvaniaPhiladelphia Daily News, newspaper in Philadelphia, PennsylvaniaThe Philadelphia Inquirer, newspaper in Philadelphia, PennsylvaniaPhiladelphia Tribune, newspaper in Philadelphia, PennsylvaniaPhiladelphia Weekly, newspaper in Philadelphia, PennsylvaniaPittsburgh Post-Gazette, newspaper in Pittsburgh, PennsylvaniaThe Plain Dealer newspaper in Cleveland, OhioPortland Press Herald newspaper in Portland, MaineThe Portsmouth Herald newspaper in Portsmouth, New HampshirePost-Tribune newspaper in Gary, IndianaThe Press Democrat newspaper in Santa Rosa, CaliforniaThe Record newspaper in Stockton, CaliforniaReno Gazette-Journal newspaper in Reno, NevadaRochester City Newspaper newspaper in Rochester, New YorkThe Rock Hill Herald newspaper in Rock Hill, South CarolinaThe Rockford Register Star newspaper in Rockford, IllinoisSacramento Bee newspaper in Sacramento, CaliforniaSan Francisco Bay Guardian newspaper in San Francisco, CaliforniaSan Francisco Chronicle newspaper in San Francisco, CaliforniaSan Jose Mercury News newspaper in San Jose, CaliforniaSanta Barbara Independent newspaper in Santa Barbara, CaliforniaSanta Cruz Sentinel newspaper in Santa Cruz, CaliforniaSanta Fe New Mexican newspaper in Santa Fe, New MexicoSacramento News & Review newspaper in Sacramento, CaliforniaSan Antonio Express-News newspaper in San Antonio, TexasSan Diego CityBeat newspaper in San Diego, CaliforniaSan Francisco Bay View newspaper in San Francisco, CaliforniaSanta Fe Reporter newspaper in Santa Fe, New MexicoSC Black News newspaper in South CarolinaSeattle Post-Intelligencer newspaper in Seattle, WashingtonThe Seattle Times newspaper in Seattle, WashingtonSelma Times-Journal newspaper in Selma, AlabamaSioux City Journal newspaper in Sioux City, IowaSouth Florida Sun-Sentinel newspaper in Fort Lauderdale, FloridaSouthern Voice LGBT newspaper in Atlanta, GeorgiaThe Springfield Republican newspaper in Springfield, MassachusettsSt. Louis Post-Dispatch newspaper in St. Louis, MissouriSt. Petersburg Times newspaper in St. Petersburg, FloridaThe Star-Ledger newspaper in Newark, New Jersey The Star Press newspaper in Muncie, Indiana<ref>After much discussion, we like Barack Obama The Star Press', May 4, 2008.</ref>
The State newspaper in Columbia, South Carolina
The Stranger newspaper in Seattle, Washington
TimesDaily newspaper in Florence, Alabama
Times-Republican, newspaper in Marshalltown, IowaTimes-Standard newspaper in Eureka, CaliforniaThe Times-Tribune newspaper in Scranton, PennsylvaniaThe Toledo Blade newspaper in Toledo, OhioThe Trenton Times newspaper in Trenton, New JerseyTuscaloosa News newspaper in Tuscaloosa, AlabamaValley News newspaper in Lebanon, New HampshireWoodbine Twiner newspaper in Woodbine, Iowa

Republicans

Rudy Giuliani

Mike HuckabeeDallas Morning NewsAdel Dallas Co. NewsAlbia Union-RepublicanChariton LeaderIowa City Press-CitizenSheldon N'West Iowa ReviewShenandoah Valley News TodayJohn McCainAustin American StatesmanThe Arizona RepublicBradenton Herald (FL)Boston Herald (MA)Boston GlobeDaytona Beach News-JournalDetroit NewsGainesville Sun (FL)Kansas City StarLos Angeles Daily NewsThe Modesto BeeNew Hampshire Union LeaderThe New York TimesThe Oregonian newspaper in Portland, OregonOrlando SentinelThe Palm Beach PostPensacola News Journal (FL)Philadelphia Inquirer newspaper in Philadelphia, PennsylvaniaThe Polk County Democrat (FL)The Springfield RepublicanSacramento BeeSt. Louis Post-Dispatch newspaper in St. Louis, MissouriSt. Petersburg Times San Jose Mercury NewsSanta Cruz Sentinel newspaper in Santa Cruz, CaliforniaThe Seattle Post-Intelligencer newspaper in Seattle, WashingtonThe South Florida Sun-Sentinel (FL)The Star-Ledger (NJ)Tampa TribuneTuscaloosa News newspaper in Tuscaloosa, AlabamaWaltham (MA) Daily News TribuneRon Paul

The Arab American News
The American ConservativeThe Muslim Observer - national newspaper
San Francisco Bay Guardian

Mitt Romney

 National Review The Daily Nonpareil (IA)
 The Times-Republican (IA)
 Sioux City Journal (IA)
 The Grand Rapids Press (MI)
 The Oakland Press (MI)
 Las Vegas Review-Journal (NV)
 Reno Gazette-Journal (NV)
 Elko Daily Free Press (NV)
 The Atlanta Journal-Constitution (GA)
 Hartford Courant (CT)
 Salt Lake Tribune (UT)
 The Denver Post (CO)
 Long Beach Press-Telegram (CA)

Fred ThompsonHuman Events''

References 

2008 United States presidential election endorsements
2008
2008 in mass media